La Muerte (Spanish for "The Death") is the sixth studio album by Dutch death metal band Gorefest. It was released in 2005 via Nuclear Blast. It was also released by Night of the Vinyl Dead in May 2006 as a double black vinyl with a colour insert, limited to 500 hand-numbered copies.

Track listing
 "For the Masses" – 4:47
 "When the Dead Walk the Earth" – 4:46
 "You Could Make Me Kill" – 5:45
 "Malicious Intent" – 5:47
 "Rogue State" – 7:09
 "The Call" – 4:52
 "Of Death and Chaos (A Grand Finale)" – 4:14
 "Exorcism" – 4:09
 "Man to Fall" – 3:50
 "The New Gods" – 4:08
 "'till Fingers Bleed" – 5:18
 "La Muerte" – 9:54

Band members 
 Jan Chris de Koeijer – vocals, bass guitar
 Frank Harthoorn – guitar
 Boudewijn Bonebakker – guitar
 Ed Warby – drums

References 

2005 albums
Gorefest albums
Nuclear Blast albums